Pyronema is a genus of fungi in the family Pyronemataceae. It was circumscribed by German naturalist Carl Gustav Carus in 1835.

References

Pyronemataceae
Pezizales genera